Michael Johnston Condon (born April 27, 1990) is an American ice hockey coach and former professional goaltender who is currently a volunteer assistant at Northeastern. He has previously played in the NHL for the Montreal Canadiens, Pittsburgh Penguins and Ottawa Senators.

Early life
Condon was born on April 27, 1990 to Mary and Teddy Condon in Holliston, Massachusetts. He has one older brother, Zach. His father is a sergeant for the Massachusetts State Police, and his mother is a real estate broker. His father was involved in the manhunt of the Boston Marathon bombers. Condon attended the Belmont Hill School before attending Princeton University, where he majored in politics.

Playing career
Undrafted at the conclusion of his career with Princeton, Condon signed an amateur tryout agreement with the Ontario Reign of the ECHL On April 7, 2013, after four games with the Reign where he went 3–1–0 with a 1.48 goals against average, Condon signed a professional tryout agreement with the Houston Aeros of the American Hockey League (AHL).

On May 8, 2013, Condon signed his first professional contract with the Montreal Canadiens.

On October 11, 2015, Condon started his first NHL game, leading the Canadiens to a 3–1 win against the Ottawa Senators. He stopped 20 of 21 shots, only allowing one goal against from Senators forward Jean-Gabriel Pageau. Senators goaltender Matt O'Connor made his NHL debut in the same game, making the two the first goaltenders to make their first NHL start on the same night since October 14, 1967. On November 9, Condon was named the NHL third star of the week for his play filling in for the injured Carey Price.

On October 11, 2016, Condon was claimed off waivers from the Montreal Canadiens by the Pittsburgh Penguins after being waived the previous day. He would only play one period (20 minutes) in relief for the Penguins before being traded to the Ottawa Senators on November 2 for a fifth-round draft pick in 2017.  Condon was acquired due to Senators' starter Craig Anderson facing an uncertain future after his wife was recently diagnosed with cancer, and backup Andrew Hammond being sidelined with an injury.

In June 2017, Condon signed a three-year $7.2M contract extension with the Ottawa Senators after being credited with saving the Senators' 2016–17 season by filling in for starter Craig Anderson during which time Condon set team records both for the most consecutive starts by a goalie (27 games) and for the fewest games needed to achieve five shutouts (32 games). In the following 2017–18 season, Condon's play dropped to a save percentage of .902, and he only won five games all season in the backup role to Anderson. However, the abysmal season the Senators had as a whole, in which the team finished second-last in the entire league, heavily contributed to this decline in Condon's performance.

On October 31, 2018, after two dreadful starts to begin Condon's 2018–19 season, the Senators decided to waive Condon and send him down to the Belleville Senators of the American Hockey League. Condon was injured with Belleville and spent most of the season on the injured list. He only appeared in one game with Belleville, recording a win and .739 save percentage with a 6.01 goals allowed average (GAA).

On July 30, 2019, Condon was traded from the Senators, along with a 6th-round pick in 2020 to the Tampa Bay Lightning in exchange for Ryan Callahan and a 5th-round pick in 2020.

Continuing his rehabilitation from injury, Condon was sidelined to start the 2019–20 season. Assigned to AHL affiliate, the Syracuse Crunch, he appeared in his first game in over a year on December 14, 2019. After 6 games with the Crunch, Condon was re-assigned to the ECHL for the first time in six years, loaned to the Orlando Solar Bears on February 5, 2020. Condon made 4 appearances with the Solar Bears before he returned to the AHL, assigned on loan by the Lightning to the Charlotte Checkers, the affiliate to the Carolina Hurricanes on February 26, 2020. Condon made a lone appearance with the Checkers, allowing 4 goals in a 5-3 defeat to the Lehigh Valley Phantoms on February 23, before he was recalled from his loan by the Lightning and returned to the Crunch.

International play
Condon was selected as a member of the United States men's national ice hockey team at the 2016 IIHF World Championship.  On May 7, 2016, he started the second game of the tournament leading the United States to a 6–3 win against Belarus.

Career statistics

Regular season and playoffs

International

References

External links
 

1990 births
American men's ice hockey goaltenders
Belleville Senators players
Belmont Hill School alumni
Charlotte Checkers (2010–) players
Hamilton Bulldogs (AHL) players
Houston Aeros (1994–2013) players
Ice hockey coaches from Massachusetts
Living people
Montreal Canadiens players
Ontario Reign (ECHL) players
Orlando Solar Bears (ECHL) players
Ottawa Senators players
Sportspeople from Needham, Massachusetts
Pittsburgh Penguins players
Princeton Tigers men's ice hockey players
Syracuse Crunch players
Undrafted National Hockey League players
Wheeling Nailers players
Ice hockey players from Massachusetts